Mystery Seeker was a website based on the Google search engine. that until November 30, 2009 had been known as Mystery Google.  The WHOIS domain name record for mysterygoogle.com was created on 10 February 2009 with registrant Google Inc, but since February 26, 2017 it has had no website.  The website has been featured in a number of technology blogs. Upon a search query, Mystery Seeker returns the results from the previous search, so "you get what the person before you searched for."

There is a trend among the people on Mystery Seeker to add so-called "missions", where the next user is asked to do something. For example, "Your mission is to copy and paste this until you see it again. Then and only then will you be a true ninja". Other examples of possible missions include telling someone you love them, sending someone a get well card, mailing a banana to someone, etc. There are also references to MLIA. Due to the high number of posted missions involving phone numbers, Mystery Seeker received enough complaints to remove phone numbers from the site. However, the developers are testing Mystery Missions Beta in order to allow the continuance of missions.

A number of phrases yield intentional responses (easter eggs).

In November 2009 Mystery Seeker had 440,000 unique visitors, making it one of the most highly trafficked social entertainment sites online.

References 

Internet search engines